South Norway is the southern and by far most populous half of Norway, consisting of the regions of Western Norway, Eastern Norway, Southern Norway (Agder) and Trøndelag (Central Norway). In English, South Norway was historically also known as Norway Proper, a term that often has a broader meaning in contemporary usage. In Norwegian, South Norway usually refers to Agder County. 

South Norway has no administrative functions, and does not constitute a cultural or linguistic region, as opposed to Northern Norway, the northern half of the country. To people from the latter region, citizens hailing from the southern half are known by the exonym  ('southerners'). Practical use of the region mostly applies to purposes such as weather forecasting.

South Norway must not be confused with Southern Norway, which is a sub-region with a distinct cultural identity limited to the southernmost county of Agder.

References

Geography of Norway
Regions of Norway